António José Teles de Meneses was a Portuguese colonial administrator who held the position of Governor of Portuguese Timor, while it was still part of the Portuguese State of India, between 1768 and 1776, having been preceded by Dionísio Gonçalves Rebelo Galvão and succeeded by Caetano de Lemos Telo de Meneses.

According to Carlos Filipe Ximenes Belo, the "Governor of Timor, António José Teles de Meneses, seeing the impossibility of defending Lifau by sea and land, took the historic decision to destroy the stronghold on August 11, 1769 and to move to the province of Belos. After some hesitation, he sailed to the bay of Dilly, and there founded the new capital of Timor and Solor, on the 10th of October, 1769".

See also
List of colonial governors of Portuguese Timor

References

Governors of Portuguese Timor
History of East Timor